Follies Girl is a 1943 American musical comedy film directed by William Rowland and starring Wendy Barrie, Doris Nolan and Gordon Oliver. It was made by the poverty row studio Producers Releasing Corporation. Much of the film takes place in or around a burlesque house. It was the final film appearance of Barrie apart from a cameo role in It Should Happen to You.

Cast
 Wendy Barrie as Anne Merriday  
 Doris Nolan as Francine La Rue  
 Gordon Oliver as Pvt. Jerry Hamlin  
 Anne Barrett as Bunny  
 Arthur Pierson as Sgt. Bill Perkins  
 J.C. Nugent as J.B. Hamlin  
 Cora Witherspoon as Mrs. J.B. Hamlin  
 William Harrigan as Jimmy Dobson  
 Jay Brennan as Andre Duval 
 Lew Hearn as Lew  
 Cliff Hall as Cliff  
 Marion McGuire as Trixie  
 Pat C. Flick as Patsy  
 Anthony Blair as Somers  
 Jerri Blanchard as Jerri  
 Sergei Badamsky as Scarini  
 G. Swayne Gordon as Doorman  
 Ray Heatherton as Bandleader Ray Heatherton  
 Johnny Long as Bandleader Johnny Long  
 Bobby Byrne as Bandleader Bobby Byrne  
 Ernie Holst as Bandleader Ernie Holst  
 Charles Weidman as Charles Weidman-Speciality 
 Fritzi Scheff as Fritzi Scheff  
 Claire and Arene as Specialty Act  
 Lazare and Castellanos as Specialty Act  
 The Song Spinners as Singers  
 The Heat Waves as Specialty Act  
 Virginia Mayo as Chorine

References

Bibliography
 Koszarski, Richard. Hollywood on the Hudson: Film and Television in New York from Griffith to Sarnoff. Rutgers University Press, 2008.

External links
 

1943 films
1943 musical comedy films
American musical comedy films
American black-and-white films
Producers Releasing Corporation films
1940s English-language films
Films directed by William Rowland
1940s American films